A sacred entity is one endowed with religious significance.

Sacred may also refer to:
Sacred (novel), a novel  by Dennis Lehane
Sacred (manga), an OEL Manga by Lizbeth R. Jimenez
Sacred (video game), a 2004 PC Action-RPG, that takes place on the magical continent of Ancaria
Sacred (Los Lonely Boys album), 2006
Sacred (Paradox album), 2004
"Sacred", a song by Depeche Mode from the album Music for the Masses
"Sacred", a song by Nina Nesbitt from the album The Sun Will Come Up, the Seasons Will Change
Sacred Microdistillery, a small distillery in London
Sacred Records, a record label founded in 1944 by Earle E. Williams 
SACRED, a microsatellite

See also
Sacer (disambiguation)
Sacred promontory, an ancient name for some promontories
 Sacred Way (disambiguation)